Tessarolax is an extinct genus of fossil sea snails, marine gastropod mollusks in the family Aporrhaidae. The fossil shells of these snails are found in Cretaceous to Paleocene deposits in Europe, North America, and Madagascar.

References

 Fossils (Smithsonian Handbooks) by David Ward (Page 122)
 Tessarolax in the Paleobiology Database
 Stromboidea.de info

Aporrhaidae
Cretaceous gastropods
Paleocene gastropods
Cretaceous animals of Africa
Cretaceous molluscs of Europe
Cretaceous animals of North America
Paleocene animals of Africa
Paleocene animals of Europe
Paleocene animals of North America
Cretaceous genus first appearances
Maastrichtian genera
Danian genera
Paleocene genus extinctions
Fossil taxa described in 1868